"Mother Tongue" is a song by British rock band Bring Me the Horizon. Produced by the band's vocalist Oliver Sykes and keyboardist Jordan Fish, it is featured on the group's 2019 sixth studio album Amo. The track was released as the fourth single from the album on 22 January 2019 and has spent twelve non-consecutive weeks on the UK Rock & Metal Singles Chart as of July 2019.

Composition and lyrics
"Mother Tongue" has been described as a pop rock and dance-pop song. According to Jordan Fish, "Mother Tongue" is the spiritual successor of "Drown". The track is a love song dedicated to Oliver Sykes' wife, Alissa Salls. Fish said of the song:

Music video
The music video for "Mother Tongue" was released via YouTube on 9 May 2019. It was filmed in the city of São Paulo, Brazil.

Charts

Certifications

References

2019 singles
2019 songs
Bring Me the Horizon songs
Songs written by Oliver Sykes
RCA Records singles
Sony Music singles